Joshua Warren Pate (born January 15, 1970) is an American screenwriter, director and producer. He wrote The Grave, Deceiver, and The Take. Pate also co-created Good vs Evil, Surface, and Outer Banks.

Early life
Josh Pate was born in Winston-Salem, North Carolina, and is the twin brother of fellow filmmaker Jonas Pate. He received a Bachelor of Arts in English from the University of North Carolina at Chapel Hill in 1992.

Career
In 1996, Pate began his screenwriting career, working alongside his brother Jonas on the thriller called The Grave. The film received a wide range of positive reviews after a screening at the Sundance Film Festival. They collaborated on the movie Deceiver the following year. "The Pate brothers" subsequently created the fantasy action television show Good vs Evil (1999). He later moved on to direct two episodes of Fastlane (2002-2003). From 2003 to 2004, Pate served as co-executive producer on L.A. Dragnet, for which he also wrote two episodes.

In 2005, he co-created the science fiction series Surface, which aired until 2006. The same year, he also co-directed the Chris Isaak music video "Please", and an episode of Friday Night Lights. He continued his film career by co-writing the screenplay for The Take (2007). From 2007 to 2008, he held the position of consulting producer on the paranormal romance television drama Moonlight.

Pate was an executive producer for the 2012 comedy fantasy film Mirror Mirror. He also signed on to co-write—with his brother—the independent crime drama film Way Down South.

Filmography

Awards and nominations

References

External links

 

1970 births
Living people
American television directors
University of North Carolina at Chapel Hill alumni
People from Raeford, North Carolina
Film directors from North Carolina